Zaczarowany ołówek (Enchanted Pencil) is a Poland cartoon from 1964 to 1976 made by Se-ma-for.

The series had no dialogue. It tells a story of a boy named Piotr (Peter) and his dog, aided by an enchanted Pencil, which can materialize anything they draw. There were 39 episodes total. The first 26 episodes have no linking story, but the last 13 are centered on the heroes' quest to save a shipwrecked refugee. They were remade into a movie in 1991.

Script: Adam Ochocki
Art: Karol Baraniecki
Music: Zbigniew Czernelecki and Waldemar Kazanecki

External links

1964 Polish television series debuts
1976 Polish television series endings
1960s Polish television series
1970s Polish television series
1960s animated television series
1970s animated television series
Polish children's animated television series